The 2014 Tour de Corse was the 11th and final round of the 2014 European Rally Championship season, held on the island of Corsica from 7–9 November 2014.

Report
The title fight was meant to go down to the wire here at Corsica between Škoda team-mates Esapekka Lappi and Sepp Wiegand. But, a fire following a testing crash for Wiegand made Lappi the champion by default.

Lappi, pleased to have been crowned the newest European Rally Champion before the event had even begun, was hoping to add to his tally of wins. It was not to be, though, as the Finn crashed on Stage 6, ending his rally.

Ex-Formula 1 driver Stéphane Sarrazin led the majority of the rally, having won most of the stages to take a dominating win, ahead of his compatriot Bryan Bouffier. This was the second time this year a Formula One driver had won in the ERC as Robert Kubica had won the season-opening Internationale Jänner Rallye.

Vitaliy Pushkar was crowned ERC Production Cup champion after the withdrawals of his nearest rivals Keith Cronin and Martin Hudec. Andrea Crugnola won the Junior class but this wasn't enough to stop Stéphane Lefebvre from clinching the title, while Zoltán Bessenyey retained the 2WD title. Eric Camilli also received the McRae Flat Out Award for the first time.

Results

References

2014 in French motorsport
2014 European Rally Championship season
2014